The Kunlun Dark Universe Survey Telescope, also known as KDUST, is a planned large survey telescope to be installed at the Chinese Antarctic Kunlun Station located at Dome A ice plateau in Antarctica. It is intended to take advantage of the exceptional observation conditions due to low temperature, clean air quality and low disturbances which reduce background noises for infrared observations.

KDUST is a 2.5 meter infrared optical telescope designed to detect and observe Earth-like planets in the Milky Way using infrared light, but at much higher resolution than the Antarctica Schmidt telescopes project. KDUST will be perched on a 14.5-meter-tall tower to lift it above the turbulence layer. KDUST is scheduled to be installed by 2025.

References 

Chinese telescopes
Proposed buildings and structures in Antarctica
Proposed telescopes
Astronomical telescopes and observatories in the Antarctic